Manzo'd with Children is an American reality documentary television series on Bravo which premiered on October 5, 2014. Bravo announced the series in April 2014, making it the first spin-off show of The Real Housewives of New Jersey. The first season concluded on November 2, 2014.

In February 2017, it was announced the series would not return for a fourth season.

Background 
The reality series follows the daily life of Caroline Manzo and her family: husband Albert, sons Albie and Chris, daughter Lauren and sister Fran. Caroline spent five seasons being a cast member of popular reality television series The Real Housewives of New Jersey before getting her own show. Manzo decided to quit the series before the sixth season. In October 2013, she explained the decision on her personal blog telling that her "role has run its course," adding that "peace and integrity cannot be bought with money or fame." Manzo also added that she was already in production on a pilot, Manzo'd With Children;  the show was eventually picked up.

In March 2015, Bravo renewed Manzo'd with Children for a second season, which premiered on August 16, 2015. In April 2016, the series was renewed for a third season, which premiered on September 11, 2016.

Cast 

 Caroline Manzo is a former cast member of The Real Housewives of New Jersey. Caroline has been married to her husband Albert for more than 30 years. She is referred as a real housewife because she spends the majority of her time managing the household.
 Albert "Al" Manzo is the husband of Caroline. Together they have three children. He runs The Brownstone, a catering facility in Paterson, New Jersey. The company is a family business that he has been handling for nearly 35 years.
 Albie Manzo is the oldest of the Manzo children. Albie and his brother, Chris, are partners and co-founders of BLK beverages since its debut in 2011. Their business has expanded to numerous major stores across the country. Albie owns Little Town New Jersey Restaurant located in Hoboken, New Jersey, which is now closed.
 Lauren Manzo is the only daughter of Al and Caroline. She runs her beauty bar, Cafface. Lauren became engaged to her fiancé Vito Scalia in November 2013. The two were married on July 18, 2015. In September 2016, the two announced they were expecting a child, On February 24, 2017, Manzo gave birth to a girl, Marchesa.
 Chris Manzo is the youngest of the Manzo children. He works together with his brother on BLK beverages as well as their restaurant, Little Town New Jersey. He is the creator of the family’s favorite pastime, the Ham Game. He is the author of a children's book.

Episodes

References

External links 

 
 
 

2010s American reality television series
2014 American television series debuts
2016 American television series endings
English-language television shows
Bravo (American TV network) original programming
The Real Housewives spin-offs
Television shows set in New Jersey
American television spin-offs
Reality television spin-offs